Hoboken–World Trade Center is a rapid transit service operated by the Port Authority Trans-Hudson (PATH). It is colored green on the PATH service map and trains on this service display green marker lights. This service operates from the Hoboken Terminal in Hoboken, New Jersey, by way of the Downtown Hudson Tubes to the World Trade Center in Lower Manhattan, New York. The  trip takes 11 minutes to complete, and is the shortest route in the PATH system.

This service operates from 6 a.m. to 11 p.m. on weekdays, and does not operate during the late-night hours or on weekends. Passengers wishing to travel from Hoboken to lower Manhattan at these times must take the Journal Square–33rd Street (via Hoboken) train from Hoboken and transfer at Grove Street to the Newark–World Trade Center line. Previously, this branch operated on weekends as well, which made it the only PATH line that ran at all times except late nights. This is one of two routes from PATH on which every station is handicapped accessible, with the other being Newark-World Trade Center.

History 
The Hoboken–World Trade Center service originated as the Exchange Place–Hudson Terminal service operated by the Hudson and Manhattan Railroad (H&M). It originally operated only between Exchange Place in Jersey City and the Hudson Terminal in Manhattan beginning on July 19, 1909. It became the Hoboken–Hudson Terminal service on August 2, 1909, after the southern terminus was extended to Hoboken Terminal via Erie station (now Newport station) in Jersey City.

The H&M was succeeded by Port Authority Trans-Hudson (PATH) in 1962. The Hudson Terminal station was replaced by the World Trade Center station in 1971 during construction of the World Trade Center. Additionally, two other stations were rebuilt by PANYNJ. Exchange Place was rebuilt during the 1960s and 1970s, and the former Erie station was rebuilt as Pavonia Avenue.

Weekend Hoboken–World Trade Center service began on October 27, 1996.

Following the destruction of the World Trade Center station in the September 11 attacks, which also required the closing of Exchange Place, the Hoboken–World Trade Center branch was suspended. Instead, a temporary branch using the same color code (green) operated between Hoboken and Journal Square. When Exchange Place reopened on June 29, 2003, the green color code was used for the temporary Hoboken–Exchange Place branch. The Hoboken–World Trade Center branch was restored when the temporary World Trade Center station opened on November 23. On April 9, 2006, weekend service on this branch was discontinued to accommodate long-term construction on the World Trade Center site.

The system, particularly the Hoboken station, suffered severe damage from Hurricane Sandy in late October 2012. Damage was also reported at Exchange Place and World Trade Center stations. Due to the lengthy amount of time necessary to repair all of the damage, service on the line was temporarily suspended. On December 19, 2012, Hoboken station was reopened after its repairs were completed. However, service on the line would not resume until January 29, 2013.

Station listing

References

PATH (rail system) services
Railway services introduced in 1909